Hermetia subpellucida is a species of soldier fly in the family Stratiomyidae.

Distribution
United States, Mexico.

References

Stratiomyidae
Insects described in 1967
Taxa named by Willis Wagner Wirth
Diptera of North America